The second season of the American television series Loki is based on the Marvel Comics character of the same name. It is set in the Marvel Cinematic Universe (MCU), sharing continuity with the films of the franchise. The season is produced by Marvel Studios, with Eric Martin serving as head writer and Justin Benson and Aaron Moorhead leading the directing team.

Tom Hiddleston reprises his role as Loki from the film series, with Gugu Mbatha-Raw, Wunmi Mosaku, Eugene Cordero, Tara Strong, Owen Wilson, Sophia Di Martino and Jonathan Majors also starring, reprising their roles from the first season. Development on a second season had begun by November 2020, and was confirmed in July 2021, with Martin, Benson, and Moorhead all hired by late February 2022. Filming began in June 2022 at Pinewood Studios and concluded in October.

The second season is scheduled to debut on Disney+ in mid-2023, and will consist of six episodes. It will be part of Phase Five of the MCU.

Episodes 
All six episodes will be written by Eric Martin, with duo Justin Benson and Aaron Moorhead directing the majority of episodes.

Cast and characters

Starring 
 Tom Hiddleston as Loki
 Gugu Mbatha-Raw as Ravonna Renslayer
 Wunmi Mosaku as Hunter B-15
 Eugene Cordero as Casey / Hunter K-5E
 Tara Strong as Miss Minutes
 Owen Wilson as Mobius M. Mobius
 Sophia Di Martino as Sylvie
 Jonathan Majors as Victor Timely

Additionally, Ke Huy Quan appears as a Time Variance Authority archivist, while Rafael Casal and Kate Dickie are cast in undisclosed roles.

Production

Development 
Development on a second season of Loki had begun by November 2020. In January 2021, the first season's head writer Michael Waldron signed an overall deal with Disney which included his involvement in the second season of Loki. Marvel Studios producer Nate Moore, who served as an executive producer on the series The Falcon and the Winter Soldier, believed Loki had "really irreverent and clever and cool" storylines that lent to the series having multiple seasons rather than being a one-off event. The second season was confirmed through a mid-credits scene in the first season finale, which was released in July 2021, and star Tom Hiddleston said "deep discussions" about the second season were already underway. First season director Kate Herron said she would not return for the second season as she had always planned to only be involved for one season, while Waldron said it "remain[ed] to be seen" if he would be involved.

In February 2022, the directing duo Justin Benson and Aaron Moorhead were hired to direct a majority of the episodes for the second season. They previously directed two episodes of another Marvel Studios series, Moon Knight (2022), which went so well that the studio wanted them to work on other projects and they were quickly chosen for the second season of Loki. Eric Martin, a first-season writer who took over some of Waldron's duties during production on that season, was set to write all six episodes of the second season, with Hiddleston and Waldron confirmed to be returning as executive producers. Benson and Moorhead were excited to approach another character in Loki who, like Moon Knight Marc Spector / Moon Knight, was defined by being an outcast and had "complexity in being [an] outcast". Pre-production had begun by the end of April 2022.

Writing 
Waldron said the season would continue the story of the first season but in a way that felt different, subverted expectations, and explored "new emotional ground" for Loki. Hiddleston explained that Loki is once again with the Time Variance Authority (TVA) and working with Mobius M. Mobius, despite Mobius not remembering Loki, and has confronted Sylvie about her actions at the end of the first season. He added that the second season would be "a battle for the soul of the TVA". The season will help connect the entire Multiverse Saga of the MCU.

Casting 
Hiddleston, Gugu Mbatha-Raw, Wunmi Mosaku, Eugene Cordero, Tara Strong, Owen Wilson, and Sophia Di Martino return from the first season as Loki, Ravonna Renslayer, Hunter B-15, Casey / Hunter K-5E, Miss Minutes, Mobius M. Mobius, and Sylvie, respectively. Jonathan Majors also returns in the season, portraying Victor Timely, another variant of He Who Remains, who he portrayed in the first season, and Kang the Conqueror, who he played in the film Ant-Man and the Wasp: Quantumania (2023); Timely was also introduced at the end of Quantumania, appearing in that film's mid-credits scene. Director Peyton Reed stated that the usage of the scene had felt natural due to the MCU's focus on multiversal stories, and the fact that the season and film were being concurrently developed. In May 2022, Marvel Studios President Kevin Feige stated that the "whole cast" would return from the first season.

In July 2022, Rafael Casal was confirmed to be cast in an undisclosed "major role" in the season. In September, Ke Huy Quan was revealed to have been cast as a TVA archivist in the season, and Cordero was confirmed to have been made a series regular for the season. Feige personally reached out to Quan to ask him if he was interested in joining the MCU following the success of his return to acting in the film Everything Everywhere All at Once (2022). In December, Kate Dickie was revealed to have been cast in an undisclosed role, reportedly as a villain.

Filming 
Principal photography began on June 13, 2022, at Pinewood Studios in the United Kingdom, with Benson and Moorhead directing the majority of the episodes, and Isaac Bauman serving as cinematographer. It was previously reported to begin in January 2022, under the working title Architect. In July 2022, location filming occurred throughout London, including at the Chatham Historic Dockyard in Kent; the set photos indicated a 1970s setting for some of the season. Filming concluded in October.

Post-production 
Paul Zucker returns as editor from the first season.

Music 
Natalie Holt was set to return from the first season as the composer by July 2022, and planned to begin scoring the season in late 2022.

Marketing 
Hiddleston, Di Martino, and Wilson shared footage from the season at the 2022 D23 Expo along with announcing Quan's casting.

Release 
The second season is scheduled to debut on Disney+ in mid-2023, and will consist of six episodes. It will be part of Phase Five of the MCU.

References 

 
Marvel Cinematic Universe: Phase Five mass media
Upcoming television seasons